Flowing Gold is a 1924 American silent drama film directed by Joseph De Grasse and starring Anna Q. Nilsson, Milton Sills, and Alice Calhoun. The film's plot concerns the Texas oil industry.

Plot
As described in a film magazine review, ex-soldier Calvin Gray arrives in the Texas oil fields and meets the newly rich Briskow family. He soon becomes involved in a medley of adventures, including saving the Briscows from business ruin, rescuing the son Buddy from a foolish marriage, revenging himself on a perjured officer who had caused his dismissal from military service, and winning the love of Allegheny Briskow. When a downpour causes a flood with burning oil floating on the waters, and lightning hitting a gusher well, Allegheny is able to rescue her sweetheart.

Cast

Preservation
A print of Flowing Gold was discovered in the Czech Film Archive, and in 2020 the National Film Preservation Foundation issued a grant to the San Francisco Silent Film Festival for the restoration of the film.

References

Bibliography
 John Woodrow Storey & Mary L. Kelley. Twentieth-Century Texas: A Social and Cultural History. University of North Texas Press, 2008.

External links

 
 
 
 
 Lobby card at www.movingimagearchivenews.org (mid page)

1924 films
1924 drama films
Silent American drama films
Films directed by Joseph De Grasse
American silent feature films
1920s English-language films
First National Pictures films
American black-and-white films
Films set in Texas
Films based on works by Rex Beach
Works about petroleum
1920s American films